Max Byers (born 29 December 1939) is a former Australian rules footballer who played with Essendon in the Victorian Football League (VFL). He was an emergency for Essendon's 1962 premiership side. Byers was later captain-coach of country side, Numurkah.

Notes

External links 		
		

Essendon Football Club past player profile
		
		
		

1939 births
Living people
Australian rules footballers from Tasmania
Essendon Football Club players
Hobart Football Club players
Numurkah Football Club players